Ignjac Krešić (born 19 October 1966) is a Croatian retired professional footballer who played as a goalkeeper, mostly for Dynamo Dresden.

References

External links

 German career stats - FuPa

1966 births
Living people
Association football goalkeepers
Yugoslav footballers
Croatian footballers
FSV Frankfurt players
Viktoria Aschaffenburg players
SV Darmstadt 98 players
Dynamo Dresden players
Kickers Offenbach players
Regionalliga players
NOFV-Oberliga players
2. Bundesliga players
Croatian expatriate footballers
Expatriate footballers in Germany
Croatian expatriate sportspeople in Germany
Croatian expatriate football managers
Expatriate football managers in Germany